Droogmansia is a genus of flowering plants in the legume family, Fabaceae. It belongs to the subfamily Faboideae.

Species
, Plants of the World Online (POWO) accepted 22 species:

References 

Desmodieae
Fabaceae genera
Taxa named by Émile Auguste Joseph De Wildeman